Carlota is a Portuguese and Spanish given name, equivalent to Charlotte in English. This name may refer to:

People 
Carlota (name)

Places
Carlota Cove, a cove in Antarctica 
Carlota Island, an island in the Philippines
Lago Carlota National Reserve, in Chile
Villa Carlota, Mexico, a farming settlement
 Carlota (Mexico), a New Virginia Colony settlement for ex-Confederate soldiers after the American Civil War
La Carlota (disambiguation)

Other
Acmaeodera carlota, a beetle species
Operation Carlota, a Cuban military intervention in Angola during the 1970s

See also

 Carlotta (disambiguation)

Portuguese feminine given names
Spanish feminine given names